Harry King (6 November 1881 – 30 June 1947) was an English cricketer. King was a right-handed batsman who bowled right-arm medium pace. He was born at Leicester, Leicestershire.

King made his first-class debut for Leicestershire against Nottinghamshire in the 1912 County Championship at Aylestone Road, Leicester. He next appeared in first-class cricket for the county in 1920, making two appearances in that seasons County Championship against Gloucestershire and Somerset. In his three matches, he scored a total of 29 runs at an average of 5.80, with a high score of 11.

He died at South Knighton, Leicestershire on 30 June 1947.

References

External links
Harry King at ESPNcricinfo
Harry King at CricketArchive

1881 births
1947 deaths
Cricketers from Leicester
English cricketers
Leicestershire cricketers